Michal Kordula (born 11 February 1978) is a Czech football manager and former player.

Kordula started his career in Baník Ratíškovice. Later, he and was transferred to FK Jablonec 97. Here, he played for seven seasons before moving to Austria to play for FC Kärnten. He then played for 1. FC Slovácko (2009–2013). In September 2017, he was appointed as the new manager of Slovácko, replacing Stanislav Levý, who was promoted to the position of director of football.

References

External links

Profile at 1. FC Slovácko website

1978 births
Living people
People from Hodonín District
Czech footballers
Czech First League players
FK Jablonec players
1. FC Slovácko players
FC Kärnten players
Czech football managers
Czech First League managers
1. FC Slovácko managers
Association football midfielders
Sportspeople from the South Moravian Region